A Soldier's Revenge is a 2020 American Western film written and directed by Michael Feifer and starring Neal Bledsoe, Rob Mayes, AnnaLynne McCord and Val Kilmer. It was Jay Pickett's final film role before his death in July 2021.

Cast
Neal Bledsoe as Frank Connor
Rob Mayes as Travis Briggs
AnnaLynne McCord as Heather Powell
Val Kilmer as CJ Connor
Jake Busey as Captain McCalister
Michael Bowen as Feldman
Jay Pickett as Kennedy
Michael Welch as Danziger
James Russo as Walsh

References

External links
 
 

2020 films
2020 Western (genre) films
American Western (genre) films
2020s English-language films
Films directed by Michael Feifer
2020s American films